Paradejeania rutilioides, known generally as the spiny tachina fly or hedgehog fly, is a species of bristle fly in the family Tachinidae. It is found in North America.

Subspecies
These two subspecies belong to the species Paradejeania rutilioides:
 Paradejeania rutilioides nigrescens Arnaud, 1951
 Paradejeania rutilioides rutilioides (Jaennicke, 1867)

References

Further reading

External links

 

Tachininae
Articles created by Qbugbot
Insects described in 1867